Eressa semifusca is a moth of the family Erebidae. It was described by George Hampson in 1898. It is found in Peninsular Malaysia and Borneo. The habitat is probably limited to lowland areas.

References

 

Eressa
Moths described in 1898